Welch Allyn, Inc. is an American manufacturer of medical devices and patient monitoring systems. Headquartered in Skaneateles Falls, New York, it was family-owned until it was acquired in 2015 by Hillrom. Hillrom was purchased by Baxter International in 2021.

History 
Welch Allyn was founded in 1915 in Auburn, New York by Dr. Francis Welch and inventor William Noah Allyn. The two formed a partnership and developed the first hand-held, direct-illuminating ophthalmoscope and convinced Allyn, a medical instruments salesman, to form a partnership. The company moved to Skaneateles Falls in 1953, where it is still headquartered today. In 2019, Welch Allyn was awarded a $100m contract to supply the United States military with patient monitoring supplies.

References

External links 

 Renovation of the Welch Allyn Corporate Headquarters

Companies based in Onondaga County, New York
Manufacturing companies established in 1915
Medical technology companies of the United States
1915 establishments in New York (state)